Aillik was a fishing and trading settlement located north of Makkovik, Labrador. The community is named after the bay in which it is located. Aillik is an Inuit term meaning "a place having sleeves", so named because Aillik Bay is shaped with two branches at its head. There is also an island which takes its name from the bay. The first postmaster (est. 1952) was John Pilgrim.

A Hudson's Bay Company trading post, also known as Eyelich, was established in 1840, with George Mackenzie as factor.

See also
List of communities in Newfoundland and Labrador
List of ghost towns in Newfoundland and Labrador

References

Ghost towns in Newfoundland and Labrador
Hudson's Bay Company trading posts